Military counterintelligence of the Armed Forces of the Union of Soviet Socialist Republics was controlled by the nonmilitary Soviet secret police throughout the history of the USSR.

The counterintelligence departments of the Armed Forces of the USSR existed at all larger military formations and were called Special Departments (Особый отдел) or third departments/sections. The staff of the Special Department would usually establish a secret network of informants.

TGU (ТГУ КГБ СССР, 3 ГУ КГБ СССР ('third')) functionaries were responsible for protection of the military units, important soldiers e.g. commanding officers against activities from military attaché offices diplomats.

Timeline

Initially there was no common counterintelligence directorate. Various Armies and Fronts had their "Special Departments".
Military Department of Vecheka, Военный отдел ВЧК
Special Department of Vecheka, Особый отдел ВЧК,
Special Department of Secret Operative Directorate of GPU NKVD RSFSR, Особый отдел СОУ (Секретно-оперативное управление) ГПУ,  July 1922
Special Department of OGPU, Особый отдел ОГПУ, September 1930
4th Division of the OGPU Special Department, 4 отделение Особого отдела ОГПУ
Special Department of the GUGB NKVD USSR, Особый отдел ГУГБ НКВД СССР (July 1934 –)
5th (Special) Dept. of GUGB, 5-й (особый) отдел ГУГБ December 1936 –
2nd Directorate of NKVD (Special Departments), 2-е Управление (особых отделов)  НКВД СССР June 1938 –
4th (Special) Dept. of GUGB, 4-й (особый) отдел ГУГБ September 1938 – Feb. 1941
3rd Directorate of People's Commissariat of Defense,(UKR НКО) Третье Управление НКО February 1941 – July 1941
3rd Directorate of People's Commissariat of Soviet Navy (UKR NKВМФ), Третье Управление НКВМФ February 1941 – January 1942
3rd Dept. of NKVD, (OKR NKVD) Третий отдел НКВД February 1941 – Jul. 1941
Directorate of Special Departments of NKVD, (УОО НКВД)  Управление особых отделов НКВД СССР July 1941 – April 1943
SMERSH (ГУРК НКО) 1943–1946
Third Chief Directorate of MGB of the USSR, Третье Главное Управление МГБ СССР, May 1946 – 1953
Third Directorate of MVD of the USSR, Третье управление МВД СССР, March 1953 – 1954
Third Chief Directorate of KGB by the Council of Ministers of the USSR, Третье главное управление КГБ при СМ СССР, March 1954 – 1960
Third Directorate of KGB by the Council of Ministers of the USSR, Третье управление КГБ при СМ СССР, 1960–1978
Third Directorate of KGB of the USSR, Третье управление КГБ СССР, 1978–1982
Third Chief Directorate of KGB of the USSR, Третье главное управление КГБ СССР, 1982–1991

Notes 

Military of the Soviet Union
KGB
NKVD
Military intelligence agencies
Counterintelligence agencies